Chaney-Monge School District 88 is a school district headquartered in Crest Hill, Illinois near Chicago. It includes only one school, the Chaney-Monge School, serving K-8.

References

External links
 

School districts in Will County, Illinois
Crest Hill, Illinois